The European Climate Foundation (ECF) is an independent philanthropic initiative working to help tackle the climate crisis by fostering the development of a net zero emissions society at the national, European and global level. Its aim is to promote climate and energy related policies that press Europe and other key global players to achieve a net zero greenhouse gas emissions society by 2050. The ECF also works to ensure Europe plays a front-runner role in demonstrating that the pathway towards this society is fair, achievable and desirable.

As a foundation, the ECF’s main operations are guided by grant making activities, which are strategically distributed among, and implemented by a wide range of organisations engaged in many different types of charitable activities to mitigate climate change. These range from research work to advocacy or public campaigning.

The ECF is funded exclusively by philanthropic sources engaged in climate change. It does not accept funding from corporate or government sources. Its funds are not used to engage with political or partisan activities, and do not support political parties, sectarianism or religious purposes. Every grantee is obliged to adhere to these rules when they accept the Foundation’s support.

In 2021, the ECF has awarded 1177 grants to 713 organisations.

Fields of work
As both a convenor and a member of a diverse network, the ECF works closely with many grantee partners, who are active in most European countries, to strengthen European climate action and climate leadership at every level. The Foundation helps partner organisations to innovate and carry out strategic activities that drive urgent and ambitious policies in support of the Paris Agreement objectives and contribute to the public debate on climate action. The aim of this is to help deliver a socially responsible transition to a net zero economy and sustainable society, in Europe and beyond.

Structure
In terms of personnel and structure, the work of the ECF is divided into three main areas:

 Sector Programmes (Land Use, Transport, Buildings, Industry & Innovation, Energy Systems & Coal, Finance, and Climate Planning & Laws) 
 Cross-cutting platforms and initiatives including work on the European Green Deal 
 Country-specific initiatives promoting climate action in France, Germany, Poland, Spain, Italy, Hungary, Czech Republic, the UK and Turkey as well as regionally-led initiatives in Central Europe and South-East Europe.

The ECF’s headquarters are based in The Hague (Netherlands).

The Foundation employs over 200 people and, since 2017, it has been led by CEO Laurence Tubiana, succeeding Dr Johannes Meier who led the Foundation for six years.

The work of the Foundation is controlled by a supervisory board, charged with governing and overseeing the ECF’s activities as well as defining the organisation's strategic direction.

The European Climate Foundation has supported the establishment of several platforms such as CarbonBrief at the end of 2010, the 2050 Pathways Platform in 2016, the Net-Zero 2050, and many more.

References

External links 
 European Climate Foundation

Climate change organizations
Nature conservation organisations based in Europe
Climate change in Europe
European Union and the environment